Samuel Block may refer to:

 Samuel W. Block (1911–1970), American lawyer
 Samuel Richard Block (died 1864), English merchant